The Allied automobile was a taxicab built in Elkhart, Indiana, by the Allied Cab Manufacturing Co. The company started production in 1932, using the factory of the Elcar automobile, which had ended production in 1931. Several former Elcar employees who had been involved with Elcar taxicab production joined the new company. Production of the Allied taxicab ended in 1934, followed by small production of the Super Allied taxicab in 1935.

References 

Defunct motor vehicle manufacturers of the United States
Motor vehicle manufacturers based in Indiana
Vintage vehicles
Defunct companies based in Indiana
Vehicle manufacturing companies established in 1932
Companies based in Elkhart County, Indiana